The Dr. Henry Clay House near Paris, Kentucky was listed on the National Register of Historic Places in 1982.

Located in the Bluegrass region of Kentucky, this house was built by late 18th-century Kentucky state representative Henry Clay in 1788 shortly after his arrival to Kentucky. Following his admission to the bar in Virginia in 1797, he would then build the Ashland Estate in Lexington, Kentucky, where he would remain until his death in 1852.

Property 
The property runs along a farm road which goes southwest from Winchester Road in Bourbon County, Kentucky. The house, known locally as "the Fort", is a very early small stone house built as a rare double pen, with one-and-one-half stories with interior end chimneys. The lower floor has two rooms and stairs in the northeast corner that lead up to a second floor. A frame shed was the most recent addition on the east side of the house, used to store hay. The north side of the property contains a family cemetery, where Henry and his wife, Lucretia Hart, are buried there along with other family members.

See also 
 Henry Clay's Law Office

References

Houses on the National Register of Historic Places in Kentucky
Houses in Bourbon County, Kentucky
National Register of Historic Places in Bourbon County, Kentucky
1788 establishments in Virginia
Houses completed in 1788
Double pen architecture in the United States
Henry Clay
Pre-statehood history of Kentucky